Jan Cvitkovič (born 1966) is a Slovenian film director, screenwriter and actor. As of April 2007 he has already won a total of 12 awards and 3 nominations at various film festivals for his work, including the San Sebastian Film Festival and the Venice Film Festival.

Biography
After one year he dropped the study of physics. He then travelled through Israel, Egypt and  Eastern Africa. When he returned, he started studying archaeology and he took a diploma in 1999. Since then he became interested in directing films.

Filmography

As screenwriter
Šiška Deluxe (2015)
Odgrobadogroba (2005) ... aka Gravehopping (UK)
Srce je kos mesa (2003)
Kruh in mleko (2001) ... aka Bread and Milk
V leru (1999) aka Idle Running (International: English title)

As director
Šiška Deluxe (2015)
Odgrobadogroba (2005) ... aka Gravehopping (UK)
Srce je kos mesa (2003)  aka The Heart Is a Piece of Meat
Kruh in mleko (2001) ... aka Bread and Milk

As actor
Zoran il mio nipote scemo (2013)
Rezervni deli (2003) .... Tovornjakar aka Spare Parts
Fantasy (2002) (TV)
V leru (1999) .... Dizzy

External links

1966 births
Living people
Slovenian film directors
People from Tolmin